Boris Veniaminovich Kaveshnikov (born 30 September 1974) is a Russian-Kyrgyzstani former middle-distance runner. He competed in the men's 800 metres at the 1996 Summer Olympics. He became a Russian citizen in 2000.

See also
List of eligibility transfers in athletics

References

External links
 

1974 births
Living people
Place of birth missing (living people)
Kyrgyzstani male middle-distance runners
Kyrgyzstani male cross country runners
Russian male middle-distance runners
Olympic male middle-distance runners
Olympic athletes of Kyrgyzstan
Athletes (track and field) at the 1996 Summer Olympics
Asian Games competitors for Kyrgyzstan
Athletes (track and field) at the 1998 Asian Games
World Athletics Championships athletes for Russia
Russian Athletics Championships winners
Kyrgyzstani people of Russian descent